This is a list of series released by TVB in 2005.

Top ten drama series in ratings
The following is a list of the highest-rated drama series released by TVB in 2005. The list includes premiere week, final week ratings, as well as the average overall count of live Hong Kong viewers (in millions).

First line series
These dramas aired in Hong Kong from 8:00 to 9:00 pm, Monday to Friday on TVB.

Second line series
These dramas aired in Hong Kong from 9:00 to 10:00 pm, Monday to Friday on TVB.

Third line series
These dramas aired in Hong Kong from 10:00 to 11:00 pm, Monday to Friday on TVB.

Weekend Dramas

Sunday series
These dramas aired in Hong Kong from 9:30 to 10:30 pm, Sunday on TVB.

Warehoused series
These dramas were released overseas and have not broadcast on TVB Jade Channel.

References

External links
  TVB.com

TVB dramas
2005 in Hong Kong television